Heart Lake is a  glacial valley lake within the Scapegoat Wilderness of Helena National Forest. It is home to Arctic grayling and westslope cutthroat trout. A trail on the east side of the lake goes to Pearl Lake and the top of the divide.

References

External links
Heart Lake Bathymetric Map Montana Fish, Wildlife & Parks 

Bodies of water of Lewis and Clark County, Montana
Lakes of Montana
Helena National Forest